Lake Neufchâteau is a little artificial lake in Wallonia near the city of Neufchâteau in the Ardennes in Belgium. The lake was built in 1958.  
It is a tourist attraction, with water sports, including pedalo, rowing, canoeing, fishing, windsurfing, etc.

See also
 

Artificial lakes
Lakes of the Ardennes (Belgium)
Lakes of Luxembourg (Belgium)
Lake Neufchateau